Layoni (also Layeni) is a village in the Maluku Islands of Indonesia.

Populated places in Maluku (province)